The U.S. Post Office and Courthouse–Havre Main, located in Havre, Montana, was designed by the Office of the Supervising Architect under James A. Wetmore in Classical Revival style and was built in 1932.  Also known as Havre Post Office and Courthouse or Havre Main Post Office, it served historically as a courthouse and as a post office.  It was listed on the National Register of Historic Places in 1986.

As of 2015, it was purchased by a local family to be their place of residence and is undergoing extensive restoration.

Its construction in 1932 was a major local happening, symbolizing assistance of the national government to the local area during the Depression.

References

Courthouses on the National Register of Historic Places in Montana
Post office buildings on the National Register of Historic Places in Montana
Neoclassical architecture in Montana
Government buildings completed in 1932
National Register of Historic Places in Hill County, Montana